The Regional Council of Sardinia (Consiglio Regionale della Sardegna) is the legislative assembly of the autonomous region of Sardinia.

The assembly was elected for the first time in 1949.

Composition
Following the modification of the regional statute, with the constitutional law 3/2013, the number of regional councillors was reduced from 80 to 60.

Political groups
The Regional Council of Sardinia is currently composed of the following political groups:

See also
Regional council
Politics of Sardinia
President of Sardinia

References

External links
Regional Council of Sardinia

Politics of Sardinia
Italian Regional Councils
Sardinia